Diahnne Eugenia Abbott (born January 1, 1945) is an American actress and singer. She played supporting roles in films of the 1970s and 1980s, including Taxi Driver (1976).

Abbott was married to actor Robert De Niro from 1976 to 1988. They had a son, Raphael, who was named after the hotel in Rome where he was conceived. De Niro adopted Drena, Abbott's daughter from a previous marriage. Drena has appeared in several of her father's films, including Showtime (2002), Wag the Dog (1997), City by the Sea (2002) and The Intern (2015). De Niro and Abbott divorced in 1988.

Abbott portrayed the pornographic movie theatre box office clerk in Martin Scorsese's Taxi Driver (1976) opposite De Niro. She has a memorable cameo in the 1977 film New York, New York, in which she sings Fats Waller's song, "Honeysuckle Rose".

She also played the object of De Niro's affections in Scorsese's 1983 film, The King of Comedy, as well as roles in the television series Crime Story (the character of Sonia) and the 1986 film Jo Jo Dancer, Your Life Is Calling (Mother). She is the cousin of singer Gregory Abbott, known for his 1986 song "Shake You Down".

Filmography

Film roles

Television roles

References

External links

1945 births
Living people
20th-century American actresses
21st-century American actresses
Actresses from New York City
African-American actresses
American film actresses
De Niro family